Le métèque is a French chanson by Georges Moustaki (1934–2013). He wrote it in 1969, and it was his first breakthrough hit, reaching number one in the French charts for six non-consecutive weeks. Before this song he had written for many singers, including "Milord" for Édith Piaf. He recorded an Italian version titled "Lo straniero", which became the best-selling record of 1969 in Italy.

Métèque is a pejorative word for a shifty-looking immigrant of Mediterranean origin.

Other versions 
The song has been translated into several languages.
1968 - Pia Colombo album A L'Olympia (Disc'Az – LPS 25)
1969 - Caravelli album Caravelli (CBS Records International – S 7-63687)
1969 - Manu Dibango album Manu Dibango (Mercury Records – 135.717 MCY)
1969 - Georges Jouvin album Trompette d'or (La Voix de son maître - 2C 062-10278)
1969 - Dominique Bellot featuring Orchestre Bernard Wystraëte album Hits Variety N° 1 (AFA – 20 728)
1970 - Bobby Solo, lyrics by Bruno Lauzi, album Bobby Folk (Dischi Ricordi – 23 23 004), published in Spain
1970 - The Musicos album Discothèque N° 2 (Concert Hall Society – SMS-15017)
1971 - Herman Van Keeken album Herman Van Keeken (Nap – 2935 001), published in The Netherlands
Greek singer George Dalaras recorded a Greek version "O Metoikos" with new lyrics by Dimitris Christodoulou in 1971.
1972 - Melina Mercouri with the title O metikos, lyrics by D. Christodoulou, album Melina Mercouri (Polydor – 23 93 027), published in Spain, Germany, Canada and United Kingdom
1978 - De Strangers with the title De gastarbeider, lyrics by Lex Colman; album Goe zot (Decca Records - DEC 193.500 K), published in Belgium
1982 - Dennie Christian with the title Voor zoiets is het nooit te laat, lyrics by David Hartsema, album Vriendschap (Polydor – 2925-134), published in The Netherlands
1986 - Stranger Alex with the title De gastarbeider, lyrics by Lex Colman; album Helemaal Alleen Op Z'n Eentje (Dureco Benelux – 66063), published in Belgium
1986 - Utako Watanabe album Devo tornare a casa mia (Omagatoki – SC 5005), published in Japan
1988 - Manolo album Manolo (Discadanse – D 76), published in France
1991 - Luc et Patrick, album Les troubadours des temps modernes (Luc – 1691), published in Switzerland
Moustaki recorded an Italian version with lyrics translated by Bruno Lauzi. His rendition of this version was released in 1969 as a single titled "Lo straniero" (B-side "Giuseppe"), with arrangement by Alain Goraguer. It reached number one on the Italian charts, and became the best-selling record of the year in Italy. In 1970, Moustaki's recording won the Mostra internazionale di musica leggera (Gondola d'oro) in Venice as the best-selling record of 1969.

Charts

References 

French songs
Songs about occupations
Songs against racism and xenophobia
Songs about race and ethnicity
1969 songs
Number-one singles in Italy